Fehmer Christy "Chick" Chandler (January 18, 1905 – September 30, 1988) was an American film character actor who appeared in more than 130 films from 1925 through the mid-1950s.  Chandler was known for his starring role as Toubo Smith in the Universal-produced 1955 syndicated television series Soldiers of Fortune.

Early life
Born Fehmer Christy Chandler (named after his uncle, well-known architect Carl Fehmer), in Kingston, New York, to Colonel George F. Chandler and the former Martha Schultze (a sportswriter and daughter of Boston Symphony Orchestra conductor Carl Schultze), by the age of 12, he was appearing as a dancer and entertainer in local stage shows. His father, an army surgeon and organizer of the New York State Police, enrolled him in a military academy, The Manlius School, which he attended for three years, serving with distinction and rising to the school rank of corporal.  At 16, though he was being groomed by his family for a military career, he dropped out to work on a tramp steamer and, later, to pursue work in vaudeville and to study dance at the school of famed choreographer Ned Wayburn.

Career
Chandler maintained a successful career throughout the 1920s as a dancer and comedian in vaudeville and burlesque, at times teamed with Naomi Morton, granddaughter of vaudeville and Broadway star Sam Morton.

In 1930, Chandler, still billed as Fehmer Chandler, joined the cast of the Liberty Bell Filling Station radio show starring Chic Sale, as Rodney Gordon, the assistant to Wheel Wilkins (Sale), proprietor of the titular gas station.  Two years later, he landed a role in the Ben Hecht-Gene Fowler Broadway play The Great Magoo.  Spotting him there, film producer David O. Selznick signed Chandler, now billed under his boyhood nickname Chick, to a film contract at RKO, telling the press that Chandler was "a cross between Lee Tracy and James Cagney."  Chandler, who had done behind-the-camera work for director Charles Brabin in 1923 and had appeared in at least one silent film as an actor, turned full-time to movie acting with his first films under contract, Sweepings and Melody Cruise, in 1933.  He appeared mainly in supporting roles, mostly comic, in nearly 120 films over the next 36 years. In the late 1930s he was a fixture at Twentieth Century-Fox, playing wiseguy sidekicks in the studio's series films.

Under the pseudonym Guy Fehmer, Chandler wrote a screenplay about racing called The Quitter.  There is no evidence the film was ever produced.

Television
In 1955, Chandler was cast in the starring role of Toubo Smith in the adventure series Soldiers of Fortune alongside John Russell as Tim Kelly. In the show, Smith and Kelly traveled the world engaging in treasure hunts, rescues, and exploration adventures. It brought Chandler his greatest fame. He was also a regular on the short-lived 1961 NBC comedy series One Happy Family.  During the off-seasons, he toured the country in stock and musical theatrical productions such as Harvey and Annie Get Your Gun.

He kept active in guest appearances on television. He portrayed photographer "Billy Hackett" in the I Love Lucy episode "Ethel's Hometown." The Alfred Hitchcock Presents episode "Alibi Me" (1959) featured a memorable character performance, earning Chandler second billing. In the 1959 debut episode of NBC's Johnny Staccato, he played a police detective who was friendly with John Cassavetes'  title character. In 1962 he appeared twice on Mister Ed, first as Mr. Hodges, the human partner of a performing elephant, in "Wilbur and Ed in Show Biz" (Season 3, Ep. 3), and then as John McGivney, a racetrack groom accused of doping, in "Horse Talk" (Season 3, Ep. 18). In 1965 he played the old fisherman Andy McGrew in the Lassie episode "Trouble at Paradise Lake" (Season 12, Ep. 7). In 1966 he played Riff Lawler in the Perry Mason mystery "The Case of the Avenging Angel." He retired in 1971 following a sixth guest appearance on Bonanza.

Personal life

Chandler was a cousin of artist Howard Chandler Christy, but he is often referred to in period newspapers articles as Christy's "nephew" simply because Chandler referred to Christy as "Uncle Howard".

In February 1925, Chandler became engaged to Ziegfeld Follies performer, beauty contestant winner, and Christy model Dorothy Knapp, whom he had met in Christy's studio in or around 1922.  Knapp broke off the engagement to pursue her career further, and Chandler then became partnered, both privately and professionally, with 17-year-old Sallie Sharon, whom he met at West Point.  The pair formed a vaudeville team but never married.  On April 4, 1931, Chandler married Eugenia "Jean" Frontai, a former contract performer with David Belasco's theatrical company.  They were married 57 years, until Chandler's death from a heart attack on September 30, 1988.  (Jean Chandler followed her husband in death [from cancer] the next day in the same hospital, South Coast Medical Center.)  The couple had no children.

Chandler had been an avid amateur auto racer—until his wife filed for a restraining order to make him stop, as he had promised to do upon their marriage.

Selected filmography

 Red Love (1925) as Tom Livingston
 Sweepings (1933) as Gene's Friend (uncredited)
 Melody Cruise (1933) as Hickey
 Blood Money (1933) as Drury Darling
 Harold Teen (1934) as Lilacs
 The Party's Over (1934) as Martin
 Lightning Strikes Twice (1934) as Marty Hicks
 Murder on a Honeymoon (1935) as Dick French
 Circumstantial Evidence (1935) as James Richard 'Jim' Baldwin
 Alias Mary Dow (1935) as Jimmie Kane
 Tango (1936) as Oliver Huston
 In Paris, A.W.O.L. (1936) as Eddie
 Forgotten Faces (1936) as Chick
 Three of a Kind (1936) as Jerry Bassett
 Star for a Night (1936) as Eddie
 Straight from the Shoulder (1936) as Fly (scenes deleted)
 Woman-Wise (1937) as Bob Benton
 Off to the Races (1937) as Spike
 Time Out for Romance (1937) as Ted Dooley
 Nobody's Baby (1937) as Elevator Operator (uncredited)
 Sing and Be Happy (1937) as Mike
 Born Reckless (1937) as Windy Bowman
 One Mile from Heaven (1937) as Charlie Milford
 The Lady Fights Back (1937) as Steve Crowder
 Portia on Trial (1937) as Barker
 Love and Hisses (1937) as Sidney Hoffman
 City Girl (1938) as Mike Harrison
 Alexander's Ragtime Band (1938) as Louie
 Speed to Burn (1938) as Sport Fields
 Mr. Moto Takes a Chance (1938) as Chick Davis
 Time Out for Murder (1938) as Snapper Doolan
 While New York Sleeps (1938) as Snapper Doolan
 Kentucky (1938) as Betting Parlor Clerk (uncredited)
 The Mysterious Miss X (1939) as Dan 'Scooter' Casey
 Inside Story (1939) as Snapper Doolan
 Rose of Washington Square (1939) as Emcee at Theatre (uncredited)
 Hotel for Women (1939) as Ben Ritchie
 Hollywood Cavalcade (1939) as Assistant Director
 Missing Evidence (1939) as Jerry Howard
 Too Busy to Work (1939) as Cracker McGurk
 Swanee River (1939) as Bones
 Honeymoon Deferred (1940) as 'Hap' Maguire
 Free, Blonde and 21 (1940) as Gus
 On Their Own (1940) as Doc Duggan
 Pier 13 (1940) as Mickey Martin
 So You Won't Talk (1940) as Lounger (uncredited)
 Charter Pilot (1940) as Fred Adams
 Ride, Kelly, Ride (1941) as Knuckles
 The People vs. Dr. Kildare (1941) as Dan Morton
 Blondie in Society (1941) as Cliff Peters
 Puddin' Head (1941) as Herman
 Two in a Taxi (1941) as Sid
 The Bride Came C.O.D. (1941) as First Reporter
 It Started with Eve (1941) as Frank - Reporter (uncredited)
 I Wake Up Screaming (1941) as Reporter
 Cadet Girl (1941) as Benny Burns
 Remember the Day (1941) as Mr. Mason
 A Gentleman at Heart (1942) as Louie
 Home in Wyomin''' (1942) as 'Hack' Hackett
 The Big Shot (1942) as Frank 'Dancer' Smith
 The Magnificent Dope (1942) as Reporter (uncredited)
 Baby Face Morgan (1942) as Oliver Harrison
 My Sister Eileen (1942) as Air Raid Warden (uncredited)
 Youth on Parade (1942) as Eddie Reilly
 Springtime in the Rockies (1942) as Stage Manager (uncredited)
 My Heart Belongs to Daddy (1942) as Jiggers Johnston (uncredited)
 Rhythm Parade (1942) as Speed
 He Hired the Boss (1943) as Fuller
 Action in the North Atlantic (1943) as Goldberg (uncredited)
 Spy Train (1943) as Stew Stewart
 Hi Diddle Diddle (1943) as Saunders
 The West Side Kid (1943) as Shoelace
 Minesweeper (1943) as Seaman 'Corny' Welch
 Johnny Doesn't Live Here Any More (1944) as Jack
 Seven Doors to Death (1944, starring role) as Jimmy McMillan
 Maisie Goes to Reno (1944) as Tommy Cutter
 Irish Eyes Are Smiling (1944) as Stage Manager (uncredited)
 Leave It to Blondie (1945) as Eddie Baxter
 Nob Hill (1945) as Wax Museum Guide (uncredited)
 Captain Eddie (1945) as Richard Lacey
 The Chicago Kid (1945) as Squeak
 Do You Love Me (1946) as Earl Williams (uncredited)
 Mother Wore Tights (1947) as Ed (uncredited)
 Blondie's Reward (1948) as Bill Cooper
 Music Man (1948) as Sanders
 Family Honeymoon (1948) as Taxi driver
 Every Girl Should Be Married (1948) as Soda Clerk
 Hideout (1949) as Joe Bottomley
 The House Across the Street (1949) as Sanlon (uncredited)
 Holiday Affair (1949) as New Year's Celebrant (uncredited)
 Key to the City (1950) as Herman - Reporter (uncredited)
 The Great Rupert (1950) as Phil Davis
 Key to the City (1950) as Herman - Reporter (uncredited)
 Curtain Call at Cactus Creek (1950) as Ralph
 Bright Leaf (1950) as Tobacco Auctioneer (uncredited)
 Wyoming Mail (1950) as Saloon Waiter (uncredited)
 Mr. Imperium (1951) as George Hoskins (uncredited)
 Show Boat (1951) as Trocadero Stage Assistant (uncredited)
 Lost Continent (1951) as Lt. Danny Wilson
 Steel Town (1952) as Ernie
 Aaron Slick from Punkin Crick (1952) as Pitchman
 Private Eyes (1953) as Eddie the Detective
 The Eddie Cantor Story (1953) as Lesser (uncredited)
 It Should Happen to You (1954) as TV Engineer in Booth (uncredited)
 Untamed Heiress (1954) as Eddie Taylor
 A Star Is Born (1954) as Man in Car at Diner (uncredited)
 There's No Business Like Show Business (1954) as Harry (uncredited)
 3 Ring Circus (1954) as Drop-the-Dip Pitchman (uncredited)
 Battle Cry (1955) as Capt. Chaplin (uncredited)
 Naked Gun (1956) as Shakey Wilson
 Once Upon a Honeymoon (1956) as Wilbur the Angel
 The Runaway (1961) as Joe Sullivan - Customs Officer
 Dangerous Charter (1962) as Kick (shot in 1958)
 It's a Mad, Mad, Mad, Mad World (1963) as Policeman Outside Ray & Irwin's Garage
 The Patsy (1964) as Hedda Hopper's Escort (uncredited)
 Nightmare in the Sun (1965) as Bartender
 The Girl Who Knew Too Much'' (1969) as Hunley Cobble

References

External links

 

1905 births
1988 deaths
Male actors from New York (state)
American male film actors
American male television actors
People from Kingston, New York
20th-century American male actors